The rule of faith is the name given to the ultimate authority or standard in religious belief. It was used by Early Christian writers such as Tertullian. The phrase is sometimes used for early creeds.

Meaning
As a standard for adherence to orthodoxy, rule of faith originally referred to the Old Roman Symbol, which was an earlier and shorter version of the Apostles' Creed and other later statements of faith. As a historical standard for adherence to orthodoxy, rule of faith may also refer to other statements of faith including the Nicene Creed, Athanasian Creed, Augsburg Confession, Articles of Dort, Westminster Confession and others, the inner light of the spirit, as among mystics.

The rule of faith is the name given to the ultimate authority or standard in religious belief, such as the Word of God (Dei verbum) as contained in Scripture and Apostolic Tradition, as among Catholics; theoria, as among the Eastern Orthodox; the Sola scriptura (Bible alone doctrine), as among some Protestants; the Wesleyan Quadrilateral of faith, which held that Scripture, tradition, reason, and experience, as among other Protestants; and reason alone, as among Rationalist philosophers.

Second century usage
In the early church, Irenaeus was writing in the second century about the "rule of faith" or "rule of truth." In Against Heresies 1.9.4 he talks about it being received by baptism and continues, in the next chapter, to explain:

Elsewhere, in the preface to his The Demonstration of the Apostolic Preaching, Irenaeus reiterates the need to "hold the rule of the faith without deviation." He goes on again to express the rule of faith across three points or articles:

Third century usage
Tertullian uses the phrases "rule of faith" and "rule of truth":

Catholic usage
Pope Pius XII in Humani generis used the term analogy of faith to say that Holy Scripture should be interpreted according to the mind of the Church, not that the teaching of the Church and Fathers should be interpreted by some theorised norm of the Scriptures.

In the Catholic Church, the Bible and sacred tradition (that is, things believed to have been taught by Jesus and the apostles that were not recorded in the Bible but were transmitted through the church) are considered a rule for all believers for judging faith and practice. The current Catechism of the Catholic Church says, "all that has been said about the manner of interpreting Scripture is ultimately subject to the judgement of the Church which exercises the divinely conferred commission and ministry of watching over and interpreting the Word of God

The Baltimore Catechism used the phrase "rule of faith":

 In Verbum Domini (2010), Pope Benedict XVI wrote:

Protestant usage
In some Protestant theology, it is a hermeneutical rule of interpreting the Bible that scripture is to interpret scripture (Sacra Scriptura sui interpres: sacred Scripture is its own interpreter). It is an understanding that enforces the Bible as the inspired Word of God, and it is therefore consistent and coherent since God cannot contradict himself.

Joseph Fitzmyer  notes that the rule of faith or analogy of faith (analogia fidei) is a phrase rooted in the Apostle Paul's admonition to the Christians in Rome in the Epistle to the Romans , which says, "We have different gifts, according to the grace given us. If a man's gift is prophesying, let him use it in proportion to his faith." (NIV, 1984)  The last phrase, "in proportion to his faith" is in Greek κατὰ τὴν ἀναλογίαν τῆς πίστεως ("analogy of faith"). In Romans 12:6 this refers to one of three possible ideas: the body of Christian teachings, the person's belief and response to the grace of God, or to the type of faith that can move mountains. 

In conservative Protestantism Romans 12:6 is viewed as the biblical reference for the term "analogy of the faith" (i.e., αναλογἰα τῆς πἰστεως). <p>For Protestants, the Bible alone is considered the word of God and the only infallible standard for judging faith and practice; hence, for conservative Protestantism, the analogy of the faith is equivalent to the analogy of scripture – that is, opinions are tested for their consistency with scripture, and scripture is interpreted by the Holy Spirit speaking in scripture (compare sola scriptura).

Orthodox usage

Analogia entis
The analogy of faith, which was advanced by Augustine of Hippo, is sometimes contrasted with the analogy of being, which, according to Thomas Aquinas, allows one to know God through analogy with his creation.

See also
 Biblical law in Christianity
 Faith in Christianity

References

Further reading
 Sproul, R. C., et al. Knowing Scripture, revised edition, IVP Books, 2009. EBSCO host

New Testament theology
Christian terminology
Philosophy of law
Wikipedia articles incorporating text from the Nuttall Encyclopedia
Analogy
Faith in Christianity